Gustavo Valderrama (born July 31, 1977, in Zulia State) is a volleyball player from Venezuela, who won the gold medal with the men's national team at the 2003 Pan American Games in Santo Domingo, Dominican Republic. In the final Valderrama's team defeated Cuba 3-0 (25-23, 25–18, 25–20). Valderrama was named best digger and receiver at the 2004 Olympic Qualifying Tournament in Porto, Portugal, where Venezuela ended up in second place behind Poland.

He won with his team the gold medal at the 2005 Bolivarian Games.

Awards

National Team

Senior Team
 2005 Bolivarian Games –  Gold Medal

References

External links
 FIVB profile

1977 births
Living people
Venezuelan men's volleyball players
Volleyball players at the 2003 Pan American Games
Pan American Games gold medalists for Venezuela
Pan American Games medalists in volleyball
Medalists at the 2003 Pan American Games
20th-century Venezuelan people
21st-century Venezuelan people